Minervén Sport Club, formerly Minervén Bolívar Fútbol Club, usually known as Minervén, is a Venezuelan football club.

History

The club was founded on January 15, 1985, in Puerto Ordaz. In 2004 were replaced by Club Deportivo Iberoamericano. On July 27, 2007 they changed the name again to Minervén Bolívar Fútbol Club. The ran into financial trouble and changed their name to Minervén Sport Club, after re-starting from the lowest professional division in 2015.

Stadium

The club plays their home matches at Estadio Hector Thomas, in the city of El Callao, which has a maximum capacity of 5,000 people. In the golden era of the club, the high profile games or those in continental competitions, where played at Polideportivo Cachamay in Ciudad Guayana. The later is shared with Mineros de Guayana, another football club of Bolívar state, and Minerven's biggest rival.

Titles

Primera División Venezolana: 1
1995-96

Performance in CONMEBOL competitions

Copa Libertadores: 4 appearances
1993: Round of 16
1994: Quarter-Finals
1996: Round of 16
1997: Round of 16

Copa CONMEBOL: 1 appearance
1994: Quarter-Finals

References

Much of the content of this article comes from the equivalent Portuguese-language Wikipedia article (retrieved January 15, 2006).

External links
Official website
AC Minerven Futbol Club Bolivar (fansite)

Association football clubs established in 1985
Minerven
Ciudad Guayana
1985 establishments in Venezuela
Defunct football clubs in Venezuela